Geoffrey Wigdor (born January 23, 1982) is an American actor. He is best known for his role in the drama film Sleepers in 1996.

Career 
Wigdor got his first role playing J.J. Forbes on the soap opera Loving, later called The City. The show was cancelled in 1997. In 1994, he played the part of Flick in the movie It Runs in the Family (aka My Summer Story). Geoffrey also appeared in commercials for Chef Boyardee and Pringles Chips. In 1996, he played young John Reilly in the film Sleepers; for his work in this film, he was nominated for the Young Artist Award for Best Performance in a Feature Film - Supporting Young Actor. He also starred in the movie Levity. He appeared on the television show Las Vegas and, in 2001, on Law & Order: Special Victims Unit (the episode was entitled "Tangled", and he played Jesse Kleberg). In 2008, he appeared on Law & Order: Special Victims Unit again, this time as Donald 'Dizzer' Zuccho in the 'Babies' episode.

Filmography

References

External links

1982 births
American male child actors
American male film actors
American male television actors
American male video game actors
Living people
Place of birth missing (living people)